Gobioclinus haitiensis, the longfin blenny, is a species of labrisomid blenny native to the western Atlantic Ocean including the Gulf of Mexico and the Caribbean Sea.  This species inhabits such habitats as reefs, beds of seagrass and near shore rocky or rubble substrates with plentiful algal growth.  This species can reach a length of  TL.  It can also be found in the aquarium trade.

References

haitiensis
Fish of the Caribbean
Fish described in 1928
Taxa named by William Beebe
Taxa named by John Tee-Van